The Yugoslavia women's national basketball team was the women's basketball side that represented the Kingdom of Yugoslavia and Socialist Federal Republic of Yugoslavia from 1943 until 1992 in international competition, and were controlled by the Basketball Federation of Yugoslavia (KSJ).

The team's first major tournament appearance was at the 1954 European Championship, hosted by Yugoslavia, in which it finished fourth. The team's biggest success in the following decades were a bronze medal at the 1980 Summer Olympics in Moscow, and a silver medal at the 1988 Seoul Olympics.

The team disappeared during the breakup of Yugoslavia in the early 1990s, and its last major tournament appearance was at the 1991 European Championship in Israel, where they finished as runners-up; losing to the Soviet Union in the final.

Competitive record

Olympic Games

FIBA World Championship for Women

EuroBasket Women

Head coaches

New national teams
After the dissolution of SFR Yugoslavia in 1991, five new countries were created: Bosnia and Herzegovina, Croatia, FYR Macedonia, FR Yugoslavia (in 2003, renamed to Serbia and Montenegro) and Slovenia. In 2006, Montenegro became an independent nation and Serbia became the legal successor of Serbia and Montenegro. In 2008, Kosovo unilaterally declared independence from Serbia and became a FIBA member in 2015.

Here is a list of women's national teams on the SFR Yugoslavia area:
  (1992–present)
  (1992–present)
  (1993–present)
  (1992–2006)
  (2006–present)
  (2006–present)
  (2015–present)
  (1992–present)

References

 
 
Women's national basketball teams
Former national basketball teams